Zill-e-Huma  is a Pakistani politician who had been a member of the National Assembly of Pakistan from August 2018 till January 2023.

Education
She has received intermediate-level education.

Political career

She was elected to the National Assembly of Pakistan as a candidate of Pakistan Tehreek-e-Insaf (PTI) on a reserved seat for women from Khyber Pakhtunkhwa in 2018 Pakistani general election.

References

Living people
Women members of the National Assembly of Pakistan
Pakistani MNAs 2018–2023
Pakistan Tehreek-e-Insaf MNAs
Year of birth missing (living people)
21st-century Pakistani women politicians